Dangé-Saint-Romain is a commune in the Vienne department in the Nouvelle Aquitaine region formerly in the Nouvelle-Aquitaine region in western France. Its inhabitants are called the « Dangéens » or « Dangéennes ».

Demographics

See also
Communes of the Vienne department

References

Communes of Vienne